Phelps Lake may refer to:
Canada
Phelps Lake, a lake in Saskatchewan
United States
Phelps Lake (Wyoming), located in Grand Teton National Park, Wyoming
Phelps Lake, a lake in Rice County, Minnesota
Lake Phelps, a lake in Washington County, North Carolina
Phelps Lake, a reservoir in Rockwall County, Texas